Zhang Xiao (Chinese:张校; Pinyin: Zhāng Xiào; born 6 August 1988 in Shenyang), previously known as Yang Zi (Chinese:杨子; Pinyin: Yáng Zǐ), is a Chinese footballer who currently plays as a forward for Zibo Cuju.

Club career
Yang joined Zhejiang Green Town youth team system in 2000. He started his professional football career in 2007 when he was sent to China League Two side Hangzhou Sanchao (Zhejiang Greentown Youth) and played as a regular center forward for the team. Yang was promoted to Hangzhou Greentown's first team squad by Wu Jingui in 2010. On 22 May, he made his Super League debut in a 2–1 home victory against Jiangsu Sainty, coming on as a substitute for Tan Yang in the 52nd minute. In the 2011 league season, he didn't have too much chance to play for the first team and mainly appeared in the reserve team league. In the last four round of the season, he became the regular start forward of the club, replacing Luis Ramírez. On 11 August, Yang scored his first and second league goal for Hangzhou Greentown, however, Hangzhou eventually lost to Guangzhou Evergrande 3–2. His performance was highly appreciated by Takeshi Okada and Marcello Lippi, managers of the two sides. In early September, he suffered a metatarsal fracture in his right foot in the training, ruling him out for the rest of the season. Yang returned to field in 2013 but could just play four matches for the club in the 2013 season.

In February 2014, Yang transferred to China League One side Shenyang Zhongze. He signed a contract with League One side Harbin Yiteng on 16 July 2015.

In March 2016, Yang transferred to China League Two club Lijiang Jiayunhao. On 23 January 2017, Yang moved to League Two side Shenzhen Ledman. He scored 13 goals in 27 appearances in the 2017 season. After failing to extended his contract with the club, Yang became an unattached player in the end of 2017. Yang joined fellow China League Two club Sichuan Longfor on 28 June 2018.

On 30 July 2021 he transferred to top tier club in Chongqing Liangjiang Athletic. He made his debut in a league game against Cangzhou Mighty Lions F.C. on 30 July 2021 in a 1-1 draw where he came on as a substitute for Dostonbek Tursunov and scored his first goal for the club.

Career statistics 
Statistics accurate as of match played 1 August 2021.

References

External links
 

1988 births
Living people
Chinese footballers
Association football forwards
Zhejiang Professional F.C. players
Zhejiang Yiteng F.C. players
Yunnan Flying Tigers F.C. players
Sichuan Longfor F.C. players
Chengdu Better City F.C. players
Chinese Super League players
China League One players
China League Two players
Footballers from Shenyang